The Grumman Aircraft Engineering Corporation, later Grumman Aerospace Corporation, was a 20th century American producer of military and civilian aircraft. Founded on December 6, 1929, by Leroy Grumman and his business partners, it merged in 1994 with Northrop Corporation to form Northrop Grumman.

History

Leroy Grumman worked for the Loening Aircraft Engineering Corporation beginning in 1920. In 1929, Keystone Aircraft Corporation bought Loening Aircraft and moved its operations from New York City to Bristol, Pennsylvania. Grumman and three other ex-Loening Aircraft employees, (Edmund Ward Poor, William Schwendler, and Jake Swirbul) started their own company in an old Cox-Klemin Aircraft Co. factory in Baldwin on Long Island, New York.  

The company registered as a business on December 6, 1929, and officially opened on January 2, 1930. While maintaining the business by welding aluminum tubing for truck frames, the company eagerly pursued contracts with the US Navy. Grumman designed the first practical floats with a retractable landing gear for the Navy, and this launched Grumman into the aviation market. The first Grumman aircraft was also for the Navy, the Grumman FF-1, a biplane with retractable landing gear developed at Curtiss Field in 1931. This was followed by a number of other successful designs.

 

During World War II, Grumman became known for its "Cats" (Navy fighter aircraft): the F4F Wildcat and F6F Hellcat, the  Grumman F7F Tigercat and Grumman F8F Bearcat, and also for its torpedo bomber, the Grumman TBF Avenger. Grumman ranked 22nd among United States corporations in the value of wartime production contracts. Grumman's first jet aircraft was the F9F Panther; it was followed by the upgraded F9F/F-9 Cougar, and the F-11 Tiger in the 1950s. The company's big postwar successes came in the 1960s with the A-6 Intruder and E-2 Hawkeye and in the 1970s with the Grumman EA-6B Prowler and F-14 Tomcat. Grumman products were prominent in several feature movies including The Final Countdown in 1980, Top Gun in 1986, and Flight of the Intruder in 1990. The U.S. Navy still employs the Hawkeye as part of Carrier Air Wings on board aircraft carriers, while the U.S. Marine Corps, the last branch of service to fly the Prowler, retired it on March 8, 2019.

Grumman was the chief contractor on the Apollo Lunar Module, the first spacecraft to land humans on the Moon. The firm received the contract on November 7, 1962, and built 13 lunar modules. Six of them successfully landed on the Moon, with one serving as a lifeboat on Apollo 13, after an explosion crippled the main Apollo spacecraft. LM-2, a test article which never flew in space, is displayed permanently in the Smithsonian Institution. As the Apollo program neared its end, Grumman was one of the main competitors for the contract to design and build the Space Shuttle, but lost to Rockwell International.

In 1969, the company changed its name to Grumman Aerospace Corporation, and in 1978 it sold the Grumman-American Division to Gulfstream Aerospace. That same year, it acquired the bus manufacturer Flxible. The company built the Grumman LLV (Long Life Vehicle), a light transport mail truck designed for and used by the United States Postal Service. The LLV was produced from 1987 until 1994. Its intended service life was 24 years, but some of them were still in service in 2020. In 1983, Grumman sold Flxible for $40 million to General Automotive Corporation of Ann Arbor.

In the 1950s, Grumman began production of Gulfstream business aircraft, starting with the Gulfstream I turboprop (Grumman model G-159) and the Gulfstream II jet (Grumman model G-1159). Gulfstream aircraft were operated by many companies, private individuals, and government agencies including various military entities and NASA. In addition, the Gulfstream I was operated by several regional airlines in scheduled passenger services. The Gulfstream I-C (Grumman model G-159C) version was "stretched" to carry 37 passengers.

In 1978, Grumman sold Gulfstream to American Jet Industries, which adopted the Gulfstream name. Since 1999, Gulfstream has been a wholly owned subsidiary of General Dynamics.

Long Island location

For much of the Cold War period, Grumman was the largest corporate employer on Long Island. Grumman's products were considered so reliable and ruggedly built that the company was often referred to as the "Grumman Iron Works".

As the company grew, it moved to Valley Stream, New York, then Farmingdale, New York, finally to Bethpage, New York, with the testing and final assembly at the  Naval Weapons Station in Calverton, New York, all located on Long Island. At its peak in 1986 it employed 23,000 people on Long Island and occupied  in structures on  it leased from the U.S. Navy in Bethpage.

The end of the Cold War at the beginning of the 1990s reduced defense spending and led to a wave of mergers as aerospace companies shrank in number; in 1994 Northrop bought Grumman for $2.1 billion to form Northrop Grumman, after Northrop topped a $1.9 billion offer from Martin Marietta.

The new company closed almost all of its facilities on Long Island and converted the Bethpage plant to a residential and office complex, with its headquarters becoming the corporate headquarters for Cablevision and the Calverton plant being turned into a business/industrial complex. Former aircraft hangars have become Grumman Studios, a film and television production center. A portion of the airport property has been used for the Grumman Memorial Park.

Products

Aircraft

Projects

 Grumman 674 Nutcracker tilting fuselage VTOL
 Grumman 698 VTOL
 Grumman G-3 project only
 Grumman G-4 project only
 Grumman G-17 project only
 Grumman G-25 project only
 Grumman G-27 project only
 Grumman G-29 project only
 Grumman G-30 project only
 Grumman G-35 project only
 Grumman G-48 project only
 Grumman G-49 project only
 Grumman G-57 project only
 Grumman G-62 project only
 Grumman G-68 project only
 Grumman G-71 project only
 Grumman G-76 project only
 Grumman G-77 swept-back wing research aircraft project
 Grumman G-78 towed target glider project
 Grumman G-84 project only
 Grumman G-85 project only
 Grumman G-86 project only
 Grumman G-91 project only
 Grumman G-92 project only
 Grumman G-97 project only
 Grumman G-107 project only
 Grumman G-108 project only
 Grumman G-110 project only
 Grumman G-113 project only
 Grumman G-114
 Grumman G-115
 Grumman G-116 project only
 Grumman G-118 project only
 Grumman G-119 project only
 Grumman G-122 project only
 Grumman G-124 jet trainer design
 Grumman G-127
 Grumman G-132
 Grumman XTB2F
 Grumman XTSF

Spacecraft
 Space
 Apollo Lunar Module
 Grumman 619 Space Shuttle

Other products
 Grumman manufactured fire engines under the name Firecat (not to be confused with the firefighting variant of the Grumman S-2 Tracker, which is sold under the same name) and aerial tower trucks under the Aerialcat name. The company entered the fire apparatus business in 1976 with its purchase of Howe Fire Apparatus.
 Grumman canoes were developed in 1944 as World War II was winding down. Company executive William Hoffman used the company's aircraft aluminum to replace the traditional wood design. The canoes had a reputation for being sturdier, lighter and stronger than their wood counterparts and had a considerable market share. Grumman moved its boat making division to Marathon, New York in 1952.
 Outboard Marine Corp. bought the division in 1990 and produced the last Grumman-brand canoe in 1996. Shortly thereafter former Grumman executives formed the Marathon Boat Group to produce the canoes. In 2000 the Group worked out an agreement with Northrop Grumman to sell the canoes using Grumman name and logo.
 Grumman sport boat
 Grumman-Flxible 870 transit buses (1978–1982)
 Ben Franklin (PX-15), a science submarine
 Grumman LLV postal vehicle widely used by the United States Postal Service and Canada Post
 In honor of Grumman's aviation and aerospace inventions, a Grumman Memorial Park was established in Calverton, New York.

References

Footnotes

Notes

Bibliography

 Ferguson, Robert G. "One Thousand Planes a Day: Ford, Grumman, General Motors and the Arsenal of Democracy." History and Technology, Volume 21, Issue 2, 2005.
 Fetherston, Drew. "Pioneers on the Runway: Raising Grumman." LI History.com, Grumman Park. Retrieved: March 18, 2009.
 Kessler, Pamela. "Leroy Grumman, Sky King." The Washington Post (Weekend), October 11, 1985.
 O'Leary, Michael, ed. "Leroy Grumman." Air Classics, Volume 19, no. 2, February 1983, pp. 27–29.
 Skurla, George M. and William H. Gregory. Inside the Iron Works: How Grumman's Glory Days Faded. Annapolis, Maryland: Naval Institute Press, 2004. .
 Tillman, Barrett. Hellcat: The F6F in World War II. Annapolis, Maryland: Naval Institute Press, 2001. .
 Thruelsen, Richard. The Grumman Story. New York: Praeger Publishers, Inc., 1976. .
 Treadwell, Terry. Ironworks: Grumman's Fighting Aeroplanes. Shrewsbury, UK: Airlife Publishers, 1990. .

External links

 International Directory of Company Histories, Vol. 11. St. James Press, 1995 (via fundinguniverse.com)
 Grumman profile on Aerofiles.com
 Grumman Memorial Park History Center
 WW2DB: Grumman aircraft of WW2
 1994 Aerial photograph of Bethpage Headquarters, including intact runways
 Grumman Firecat on multimedia gallery
 Archived 2007 Newsday article on decline of Grumman
 

Aerospace companies of the United States
Defunct aircraft manufacturers of the United States
Manufacturing companies based in New York (state)
Companies based in Nassau County, New York
Manufacturing companies established in 1929
Technology companies established in 1929
Vehicle manufacturing companies established in 1929
Manufacturing companies disestablished in 1994
Technology companies disestablished in 1994
Airports in Nassau County, New York
Defunct technology companies based in New York (state)